Americans in Europe is the title of two live albums by American jazz musicians recorded in West Germany in 1963 and released on the Impulse! label. The two volumes were later reissued on a single CD in 1994 but with five tracks from Vol. 2 omitted.

Reception
The Allmusic review called the CD compilation "A fine bop-oriented set of music by a variety of mostly underrated players".

Track listing
Vol. 1:
 "No Smokin' / Low Life" - 10:50   
 "I Can't Get Started" - 5:40   
 "Freeway / Pyramid" - 11:30   
 "'Round Midnight" - 7:15   
Vol. 2:
 "My Buddy Run Rabbits" - 4:33 Omitted from CD reissue  
 "Why Daughter How Are You" - 4:00 Omitted from CD reissue     
 "Rose Room" - 3:30 Omitted from CD reissue    
 "Wine, Whiskey and Gin Head Woman" - 6:20 Omitted from CD reissue     
 "Lots of Talk for You" - 2:50 Omitted from CD reissue     
 "All the Things You Are - 9:55   
 "I Remember Clifford" - 7:15

Personnel

Vol. 1, Track 1: Kenny Clarke Trio
Kenny Clarke - drums 
Jimmy Gourley - guitar 
Lou Bennett - organ
Vol. 1, Track 2: Idrees Sulieman Quartet
Idrees Sulieman - trumpet
Bud Powell - piano 
Jimmy Woode - bass
Joe Harris - drums 
Vol. 1, Track 3: Bill Smith Quintet
Bill Smith - clarinet
Herb Geller - alto saxophone
Jimmy Gourley - guitar 
Bob Carter - bass 
Joe Harris - drums
Vol. 1, Track 4: Bud Powell Trio  
Bud Powell - piano 
Jimmy Woode - bass
Joe Harris - drums 

Vol. 2, Tracks 1 & 2: The Traditional Americans in Europe   
Nelson Williams, Peanuts Holland - trumpet  
Albert Nicholas - clarinet
Earle Howard - piano
Jimmy Woode - bass
Kansas Fields - drums
Vol. 2, Track 3: Albert Nicholas Quartet 
Albert Nicholas - clarinet
Earle Howard - piano
Jimmy Woode - bass
Kansas Fields - drums
Vol. 2., Track 4: Champion Jack Dupree
Champion Jack Dupree - piano, vocals
Bob Carter - bass
Vol. 2., Track 5: Curtis Jones
Curtis Jones - piano, vocals
Bob Carter - bass
Vol. 2, Tracks 6 & 7: Don Byas Quintet
Don Byas - tenor saxophone
Idrees Sulieman  - trumpet
Bud Powell - piano
Jimmy Woode - bass 
Joe Harris - drums

References

1963 albums
Impulse! Records live albums
Bud Powell albums
Kenny Clarke albums
Champion Jack Dupree albums
Don Byas albums
Curtis Jones (pianist) albums
Idrees Sulieman albums